fa:معماری برچسب خورده
In computer science, a tagged architecture is a particular type of computer architecture where every word of memory constitutes a tagged union, being divided into a number of bits of data, and a tag section that describes the type of the data: how it is to be interpreted, and, if it is a reference, the type of the object that it points to. In contrast, program and data memory are indistinguishable in the von Neumann architecture, making the way the memory is referenced critical to interpret the correct meaning.

Notable examples of American tagged architectures were the Lisp machines, which had tagged pointer support at the hardware and opcode level, the Burroughs large systems, which have a data-driven tagged and descriptor-based architecture, and the non-commercial Rice Computer. Both the Burroughs and Lisp machine are examples of high-level language computer architectures, where the tagging is used to support types from a high-level language at the hardware level.

In addition to this, the original Xerox Smalltalk implementation used the least-significant bit of each 16-bit word as a tag bit: if it was clear then the hardware would accept it as an aligned memory address while if it was set it was treated as a (shifted) 15-bit integer. Current Intel documentation mentions that the lower bits of a memory address might be similarly used by some interpreter-based systems.

In the Soviet Union, the Elbrus series of supercomputers pioneered the use of tagged architectures in 1973.

See also
 Executable space protection

References

Computer architecture